Shannon Drayer is an American sports journalist who covers the Seattle Mariners for 710 AM KIRO, the ESPN Radio station in Seattle, Washington.

Career

In 1997, Drayer was working as a barista at a Starbucks coffee shop when a customer encouraged her to submit a tape for a sports radio contest at KJR, a Seattle sports radio channel. As one of the finalists, Drayer started getting fill-in spots covering Washington Huskies men's basketball, the Seattle SuperSonics, the Seattle Seahawks, and the Mariners for KJR for four years.

In 2003, KOMO radio hired Drayer to cover the Mariners beat for their radio station full-time. She covered the Mariners beat for six years for KOMO before being hired by KIRO. Since 2009, Drayer has served as KIRO's clubhouse reporter, interviewing players and coaches before and after the game for the radio station. She also writes a Mariners blog for the KIRO website.

Role as female sports reporter covering male athletes
Drayer said in an interview that while she loved baseball, she knew she could not play or manage because she was female, and had initially dismissed journalism as a career option because when she was in college in the late 1980s, "pretty much the only women who were working in sportscasting were ex- beauty queens and basketball players." When she was hired for the Mariners beat by KOMO, Drayer became one of the first female sports journalists in the United States to travel with the team on their airplane. Drayer has said her gender was not an issue in the clubhouse, and that as long as she did her job as a reporter professionally, she was treated the same as male colleagues. Generally, players have treated her with respect, opening doors for her and ensuring she has a chance to ask her questions, she said.

Personal
She played trumpet in the University of Washington marching band. After receiving a degree in drama from the University of Washington, she spent a year in New York pursuing an acting career before moving back to Seattle.

References

External links
 Shannon Drayer on Twitter
Shannon Drayer's blog

Living people
American sports journalists
Seattle Mariners announcers
Year of birth missing (living people)